The British Institute of Radiology (BIR) is a radiology society and charity  based in London, United Kingdom. It is the oldest institute of its kind in the world, forming on 2 April 1897.

History

The society can be traced back to two separate institutes, "The X-Ray Society" in April, 1897, and "The Röntgen Society"; both were formed in the wake of the discovery of X-rays by Wilhelm Röntgen in 1895. The latter was founded by Dr John Macintyre in 1897. He had been the first person in Britain to use X-rays, using equipment created by William Thomson, Lord Kelvin at Glasgow Royal Infirmary on 5 February 1896.

The formalisation of the BIR occurred in 1927 upon the merger of the two societies. The BIR became a registered charity in 1963.

Among other publications, the BIR publishes several journals including the British Journal of Radiology (BJR), and Dentomaxillofacial Radiology (the official journal of the International Association of Dentomaxillofacial Radiology, IADMFR). The  Archives of Clinical Skiagraphy, first published in 1896, ultimately became the BJR in 1928.

Notable past presidents
 1897-98 Silvanus P Thompson
 1907-08 William Duddell
 1922-23 Sir Humphry Rolleston
 1923-24 Sir Oliver Lodge
 1972-73 Robert Steiner
 1973-74 Frank Farmer
 2003-04 Janet Husband

References

External links
 The British Institute of Radiology website

Health in the London Borough of Islington
Medical associations based in the United Kingdom
Organisations based in the London Borough of Islington
Organizations with year of establishment missing
Radiology organizations